China Chuneng Tower is a  tall skyscraper in Shenzhen, Guangdong, China. Construction started in 2013 and was completed in 2016.

See also
List of tallest buildings in Shenzhen

References

Skyscraper office buildings in Shenzhen
Office buildings completed in 2016